Uloborus walckenaerius, also known as the feather-legged spider, is a cribellate spider in the family Uloboridae. Like all spiders in this family, they do not have venom glands and immobilize their prey with over 140 metres of thread. They are named in honor of Charles Athanase Walckenaer.

Description 
Adult females have a body length of 3.5–6 mm (0.14–0.24 in), males 3–4 mm (0.12–0.17 in). They have a dark grey prosoma, covered with white hairs, leaving some dark bands uncovered. They have eight eyes, arranged in two almost parallel rows of four, with the anterior lateral eyes on the front corners of the head. The abdomen is greyish-white in colour, with a continuation of the pattern on the carapace. It bears a brown median line, with alternating white and brown bands on either side. There are fluffy white tufts of hair on the white bands, which are very distinct from the side. The legs range from dark grey-brown to reddish-brown, with faint, white annulations. The front two pairs of legs are significantly longer than the rear pairs.

Distribution and Habitat 
Globally they are found in Europe, Russia, Iraq, Iran, Central Asia, China, Korea, and Japan. The spider lives in warm, open terrain, like heathland, and weaves horizontal cribellate orb webs close to the ground. A stabilimentum is sometimes present, and the spider hangs beneath the hub.

References

External links 
 Picture of U. walckenaerius
 Picture, synonyms, references and other information at the Nearctic Spider Database

Uloboridae
Spiders of Europe
Spiders described in 1806
Palearctic spiders